Vratnik may refer to:

 Vratnik (Sarajevo), a neighbourhood of Stari Grad, Sarajevo, Bosnia and Herzegovina
 Vratnik Pass (Bulgaria), a mountain pass over the Balkan Mountain
 Vratnik pass (Croatia), a mountain pass over the Velebit
 Vratnik Samoborski, a village near Samobor, Croatia
 Vratnik, Lika-Senj County, a village near Senj, Croatia